Leslie Black (23 January 1900 – 12 November 1974) was a Canadian boxer. He competed in the men's middleweight event at the 1924 Summer Olympics.

References

External links
 

1900 births
1974 deaths
Canadian male boxers
Olympic boxers of Canada
Boxers at the 1924 Summer Olympics
People from Bruce County
Boxing people from Ontario
Middleweight boxers